Aeroacoustics is a branch of acoustics that studies noise generation via either turbulent fluid motion or aerodynamic forces interacting with surfaces. Noise generation can also be associated with periodically varying flows.  A notable example of this phenomenon is the Aeolian tones produced by wind blowing over fixed objects.

Although no complete scientific theory of the generation of noise by aerodynamic flows has been established, most practical aeroacoustic analysis relies upon the so-called aeroacoustic analogy, proposed by Sir James Lighthill in the 1950s while at the University of Manchester. whereby the governing equations of motion of the fluid are coerced into a form reminiscent of the wave equation of "classical" (i.e. linear) acoustics in the left-hand side with the remaining terms as sources in the right-hand side.

History
The modern discipline of aeroacoustics can be said to have originated with the first publication of  Lighthill in the early 1950s, when noise generation associated with the jet engine was beginning to be placed under scientific scrutiny.

Lighthill's equation
Lighthill rearranged the Navier–Stokes equations, which govern the flow of a compressible viscous fluid, into an inhomogeneous wave equation, thereby making a connection between fluid mechanics and acoustics. This is often called "Lighthill's analogy" because it presents a model for the acoustic field that is not, strictly speaking, based on the physics of flow-induced/generated noise, but rather on the analogy of how they might be represented through the governing equations of a compressible fluid.

The first equation of interest is the conservation of mass equation, which reads

Next is the conservation of momentum equation, which is given by

Note that  is a tensor (see also tensor product). Differentiating the conservation of mass equation with respect to time, taking the divergence of the last equation and subtracting the latter from the former, we arrive at

Subtracting , where  is the speed of sound in the medium in its equilibrium (or quiescent) state, from both sides of the last equation and rearranging it results in

which is equivalent to

where  is the identity tensor, and  denotes the (double) tensor contraction operator.

The above equation is the celebrated Lighthill equation of aeroacoustics. It is a wave equation with a source term on the right-hand side, i.e. an inhomogeneous wave equation. The argument of the "double-divergence operator" on the right-hand side of last equation, i.e.

Using Einstein notation, Lighthill’s equation can be written as

where

In practice, it is customary to neglect the effects of viscosity on the fluid, i.e. one takes , because it is generally accepted that the effects of the latter on noise generation, in most situations, are orders of magnitude smaller than those due to the other terms. Lighthill provides an in-depth discussion of this matter.

In aeroacoustic studies, both theoretical and computational efforts are made to solve for the acoustic source terms in Lighthill's equation in order to make statements regarding the relevant aerodynamic noise generation mechanisms present.

Finally, it is important to realize that Lighthill's equation is exact in the sense that no approximations of any kind have been made in its derivation.

Related model equations 
In their classical text on fluid mechanics, Landau and Lifshitz derive an aeroacoustic equation analogous to Lighthill's (i.e., an equation for sound generated by "turbulent" fluid motion), but for the incompressible flow of an inviscid fluid. The inhomogeneous wave equation that they obtain is for the pressure  rather than for the density  of the fluid. Furthermore, unlike Lighthill's equation, Landau and Lifshitz's equation is not exact; it is an approximation.

Then, upon substitution the assumed relation between pressure and density into  we obtain the equation (for an inviscid fluid, σ = 0)

And for the case when the fluid is indeed incompressible, i.e.  (for some positive constant ) everywhere, then we obtain exactly the equation given in Landau and Lifshitz, namely

A similar approximation [in the context of equation ], namely , is suggested by Lighthill [see Eq. (7) in the latter paper].

Of course, one might wonder whether we are justified in assuming that . The answer is affirmative, if the flow satisfies certain basic assumptions.

However, even after the above deliberations, it is still not clear whether one is justified in using an inherently linear relation to simplify a nonlinear wave equation. Nevertheless, it is a very common practice in nonlinear acoustics as the textbooks on the subject show: e.g., Naugolnykh and Ostrovsky and Hamilton and Morfey.

See also 
Acoustic theory
Aeolian harp
Computational aeroacoustics

References

External links 
 M. J. Lighthill, "On Sound Generated Aerodynamically. I. General Theory," Proc. R. Soc. Lond. A 211 (1952)  pp. 564–587. This article on JSTOR.
 M. J. Lighthill, "On Sound Generated Aerodynamically. II. Turbulence as a Source of Sound," Proc. R. Soc. Lond. A 222 (1954) pp. 1–32. This article on JSTOR.
 L. D. Landau and E. M. Lifshitz, Fluid Mechanics 2ed., Course of Theoretical Physics vol. 6, Butterworth-Heinemann (1987) §75. , Preview from Amazon.
 K. Naugolnykh and L. Ostrovsky, Nonlinear Wave Processes in Acoustics, Cambridge Texts in Applied Mathematics vol. 9, Cambridge University Press (1998) chap. 1. , Preview from Google.
 M. F. Hamilton and C. L. Morfey, "Model Equations," Nonlinear Acoustics, eds. M. F. Hamilton and D. T. Blackstock, Academic Press (1998) chap. 3. , Preview from Google.
Aeroacoustics at the University of Mississippi
Aeroacoustics at the University of Leuven
International Journal of Aeroacoustics 
Examples in Aeroacoustics from NASA 
Aeroacoustics.info

Acoustics
Aerodynamics
Fluid dynamics
Sound